During the 1988–89 English football season, Middlesbrough finished third from bottom in the Football League First Division and were relegated after just one season.

After a decent first half of the season, having occupied seventh place in November, they won just one of their last 17 League matches and fell into the relegation places on the final day of the season after losing 1–0 to Sheffield Wednesday. Bernie Slaven was one of the First Division's top scorers with 15 goals in the League, but Peter Davenport scored just four times after signing from Manchester United.

Middlesbrough were eliminated from both the FA Cup and the League Cup at the round they entered each competition. They were beaten by lower league opposition, Grimsby Town and Tranmere Rovers respectively.

League table

Results

Football League First Division

FA Cup

League Cup

Simod Cup

Squad

Appearances and goals

Appearance and goalscoring records for all the players who were in the Middlesbrough F.C. first team squad during the 1988–89 season.

|}

References

Middlesbrough F.C. seasons
Middlesbrough